Simon Long Downey (June 4, 1877 – October 24, 1950) was an American farmer and politician who served two non-consecutive terms in the Maryland House of Delegates.

References 

1877 births
1950 deaths
Republican Party members of the Maryland House of Delegates
20th-century American politicians